Senator Gonzalez (or González; or Gonzales) may refer to:

Efrain Gonzalez Jr. (born 1948), New York State Senate
Henry B. González (1916–2000), Texas State Senate
Julie Gonzales (fl. 2010s), Colorado State Senate
Junior González (fl. 1990s–2000s), Senate of Puerto Rico
Lena Gonzalez (born 1981), California State Senate
Luz M. Santiago González (born 1957), Senate Puerto Rico
María Teresa González (fl. 2010s), Senate of Puerto Rico
Neptali Gonzales (1923–2001), Senate of the Philippines
Rafael Rodríguez González (Puerto Rican politician) (fl. 1990s), Senate of Puerto Rico
Sally Ann Gonzales (born 1957), Arizona State Senate
Velda González (1933–2016), Senate of Puerto Rico